Guysborough was an electoral district in Nova Scotia, Canada, that was represented in the House of Commons of Canada from 1867 to 1917.

It was created in the British North America Act, 1867, and was abolished in 1914 when it was merged into Antigonish—Guysborough. It consisted of Guysborough County.

Members of Parliament

This riding elected the following Members of Parliament:

Election results

See also 

 List of Canadian federal electoral districts
 Past Canadian electoral districts

External links 
 Riding history for Guysborough (1867–1914) from the Library of Parliament

Former federal electoral districts of Nova Scotia